Abdulaziz Jassim Kanoo (1931 – August 31, 2016, Mahooz) is a Bahraini businessman.

Early life and education
He belongs to the famed Kanoo family, one of the leading merchant families of the Gulf States. Attending primary and secondary school in Somerset, England, he enrolled in the American University of Beirut and went on to earn a business degree in Scotland.

Career
He held the following positions:
 Yusuf Bin Ahmed Kanoo Company, Vice-Chairman and Deputy CEO
 Al Jazeera Tourism Company, Chairman of the Board
 Saudi Corporation for Industry and Commerce, Chairman of the Board
 Saudi Loading Company, Chairman of the Board
 Saudi Arabian Lube Additives Company Limited, Chairman of the Board
 Novotel Bahrain Al Dana Resort, Chairman of the Board
 Investcorp, Vice-Chairman of the Board
 Taaleem Educational Services, Vice-Chairman of the Board
 Saudi Arabian General Investment Authority, Director for the Eastern Province
 United Arab Shipping Company, Member of the Board of Directors
 Saudi Public Transport Company (SAPTCO), Member of the Board of Directors
 Gulf Union Insurance & Reinsurance Company, Member of the Board of Directors
 Bahrain Public Transport Company, Member of the Board of Directors
 Dammam Central Hospital, Member of the Board of Directors	
 Al Madinah Region Development Authority, Member of the Board of Directors
 Saudi Society of Family and Community Medicine, Member of the Board of Directors
 Saudi Diabetes and Endocrine Association, Member of the Board of Directors
 Public Bank Berhad, Member of the Board of Directors
 Human Rights Commission (Saudi Arabia), Eastern Province, Member of the Board of Directors

Personal life
He married his cousin, Sarah Ali Kanoo, and had four children with her: Ali, Saud, Nawf, and Badr. On January 8, 2018, his widow died and was buried in Manama Cemetery.

His brother is Abdul Latif Jassim Kanoo, founder of the Beit Al Quran, a world-renowned museum of the Quran.

Honors
In 2007, Hamad bin Isa Al Khalifa, the King of Bahrain, awarded him the King Hamad Order of the Renaissance, the nation's highest civilian honor. In 1994, he was called the first businessman in the Kingdom of Saudi Arabia.

Death
Kanoo died on August 31, 2016, at the age of 85 at his home in Mahooz, Capital Governorate. He was buried in Manama Cemetery.

References

1931 births
2016 deaths
Bahraini businesspeople
People from Manama